Isostichopus badionotus, also known as the chocolate chip cucumber or the cookie dough sea cucumber, is a species of sea cucumber in the family Stichopodidae. This common species is found in warm parts of the Atlantic Ocean.

Description 
It has distinctive dark coloured "warts" in three coarse rows on its dorsal surface, the rest of the body may vary from white through to shades of orange to brown, with sometimes large brownish stains. The mouth is located ventrally and surrounded by about 20 large tentacles.

Habitat and range 
This species is widespread in the warm Atlantic, where found from North Carolina (USA), through the Caribbean, to north Brazil, at Ascension Island and in the Gulf of Guinea.

It inhabits shallow waters, in a wide variety of bottoms (sand, mud, rock, seaweeds...).

Reproduction 
Similar to other tropical Holothuroidea, the Isostichopus badiontus is dioecious. Males and females release their gametes into water where fertilization happens externally. A study in the Caribbean Sea observed that the species has an increase in reproductive activity when temperatures increase.

Conservation Status 
As bottom feeders, Isostichopus badionotus individuals are threatened by contaminated substrates due to metals left behind by boats. Additionally, they are popular in Asian cuisine, and are also threatened by illegal fishing and trafficking.

References

Smithsonian Tropical Research Institute

External links
 

Stichopodidae
Fauna of the Atlantic Ocean
Animals described in 1867